Mshewe is an administrative ward in the Mbeya Rural district of the Mbeya Region of Tanzania. In 2016 the Tanzania National Bureau of Statistics report there were 7,278 people in the ward, from 11,241 in 2012.

Villages and hamlets 
The ward has 5 villages, and 40 hamlets.

 Mshewe
 Chang'ombe
 Chapaulenje
 Ihanga
 Ihanga mpakani
 Ijombe
 Itotowe
 Maula
 Mpalule
 Mshewaje
 Mshewe Kati
 Ilota
 Ilota
 Maporomoko
 Mpona A
 Mpona B
 Muvwa
 Chang'ombe
 Forest
 Ijombe
 Ivomo
 Kafupa
 Kagera
 Lutengano
 Mtakuja
 Mwembeni
 Mwembesongwa
 Tononoka
 Njelenje
 Ileya
 Ilolo
 Iwola
 Kizota
 Mpinza
 Mpunguruma
 Njela
 Ujombe
 Mapogoro
 Forest
 Ibojo
 Majengo
 Mbuyuni
 Mkonge
 Nandala
 Soweto

References 

Wards of Mbeya Region